John Roskam is the executive director of the Institute of Public Affairs (IPA), a libertarian think tank based in Melbourne, Australia.

Career 
According to Roskam's byline on an opinion column in the Australian Financial Review, "during the 2001 federal election he worked on the Liberals' federal campaign".

He has run for Liberal Party preselection and missed out a number of times.

Prior to his employment at the IPA, Roskam was the executive director of The Menzies Research Centre - a think tank for the Liberal Party - in Canberra.

He has also taught political theory at the University of Melbourne and held positions as Chief of Staff to Dr David Kemp,  the Federal Minister for Employment, Education, Training and Youth Affairs, as Senior Advisor to Don Hayward, Victorian Minister for Education in the first Kennett Government, and as Manager of Government and Corporate Affairs for Rio Tinto Group.

With Gary Johns he has worked for the IPA - including on a contract with the federal government - to develop proposals to limit the role of nongovernmental organisations on public policy.

Free Speech Controversy in 2014 
Despite positioning himself and the IPA as champions of free speech, John Roskam fired Australian energy economist Alan Moran from the IPA for comments he made on Twitter in relation to Islam. The sacking was justified by Roskam having reference to the personal views of Moran, expressed publicly, on his personal Twitter account. Moran's departure followed a sustained campaign from renewable energy and green activists to have him fired because they disagreed with his views on energy policy. The dismissal of a senior employee from the IPA for their personal views laid Roskam and the IPA open to charges of hypocrisy in relation to free speech and has been viewed a high-profile capitulation to the politics of personal destruction.

Moran's sacking followed shortly after Roskam also stood down IPA Research fellow Aaron Lane for satirical comments he had made years earlier on a micro-blogging site prior to employment with the organisation. In spite of Lane's remarks preceding his relationship with the IPA and being completely unrelated to his employment, Roskam opined that "What he did is entirely inappropriate. It's wrong".

Resignation as Executive Director of IPA 

Roskam announced on 17 November 2021 that he would resign as executive director of the IPA in June 2022. Roskam further announced he would continue work to at the IPA as a Senior Fellow and complete his "book on the enduring relevance of the work of George Orwell.”

Notes

External links
 Institute of Public Affairs's John Roskam profile.

Australian political philosophers
Living people
Australian lobbyists
Academic staff of the University of Melbourne
Year of birth missing (living people)